A police car (also called a police cruiser, police interceptor, patrol car, area car, cop car, prowl car, squad car, radio car, or radio motor patrol) is a ground vehicle used by police and law enforcement for transportation during patrols and responses to calls for service. A type of emergency vehicle, police cars are used by police officers to patrol a beat, quickly reach incident scenes, and transport and temporarily detain suspects, all while establishing a police presence and providing visible crime deterrence.

Police cars are traditionally sedans, though SUVs, crossovers, station wagons, hatchbacks, pickup trucks, utes, vans, trucks, off-road vehicles, and even performance cars have seen use in both standard patrol roles and specialized applications. Most police cars are existing vehicle models sold on the civilian market that may or may not be modified variants of their original models (such as the Ford Crown Victoria Police Interceptor being a variant of the Ford Crown Victoria); the few purpose-built examples include the canceled Carbon Motors E7 and the Lenco BearCat armored vehicle.

Police cars usually contain communication devices, issued weaponry, and a variety of equipment, with emergency lights, a siren, and livery markings to distinguish the vehicle as a police car.

History

The first police car was an electric wagon used by the Akron Police Department in Akron, Ohio in 1899. The first operator of the police patrol wagon was Officer Louis Mueller, Sr. It could reach  and travel  before its battery needed to be recharged. The car was built by city mechanical engineer Frank Loomis. The US$2,400 vehicle was equipped with electric lights, gongs, and a stretcher. The car's first assignment was to pick up a drunken man at the junction of Main and Exchange streets.

Ford introduced the flathead V8 in the 1932 Ford as the first mass-marketed V8 car; this low-priced, mass-marketed V8 car became popular with police in the United States, establishing strong brand loyalty that continued into the 21st century. Starting in the 1940s, major American automakers, namely the Big Three, began to manufacture specialized police cars. Over time, these became their own dedicated police fleet offerings, such as the Ford Police Interceptor and Chevrolet 9C1.

In the United Kingdom, Captain Athelstan Popkess, Chief Constable of the Nottingham City Police from 1930 to 1959, transformed British police from their Victorian era foot patrol beat model to the modern car-based reactive response model, through his development of the "Mechanized Division", which used two-way radio communication between police command and police cars. Under Popkess, the Nottingham City Police began to use police cars as an asset that police tactics centered around, such as overlaying police car patrol sectors over foot patrol beats and using police cars to pick up foot patrol officers while responding to crimes.

As car ownership increased in the post-World War II economic expansion, police cars became significantly more common in a majority of developed countries as car ownership increased, police jurisdictions expanded farther out into residential and suburban areas, car-oriented urban planning and highways dominated cities, vehicular crimes and police evasion in cars increased, and more equipment was issued to police officers, to the point that vehicles became practically necessary for modern law enforcement.

Types
Various types of police car exist. Depending on the organization of the law enforcement agency, the class of vehicle used as a police car, and the environmental factors of the agency's jurisdiction, many of the types below may or may not exist in certain fleets, or their capabilities may be merged to create all-rounded units with shared vehicles as opposed to specialized units with separate vehicles.

Patrol car
A patrol car is a police car used for standard patrol. Used to replace traditional foot patrols, the patrol car's primary function is to provide transportation for regular police duties, such as responding to calls, enforcing laws, or simply establishing a more visible police presence while on patrol. Driving a patrol car allows officers to reach their destinations more quickly and to cover more ground compared to other methods. Patrol cars are typically designed to be identifiable as police cars to the public and thus almost always have proper markings, roof-mounted emergency lights, and sirens.

Response car
A response car, also known as a pursuit car, area car, rapid response unit, or fast response car, is a police car used to ensure quick responses to emergencies compared to patrol cars. It is likely to be of a higher specification, capable of higher speeds, and often fitted with unique markings and increased-visibility emergency lights. These cars are generally only used to respond to emergency incidents and may carry specialized equipment not used in regular patrol cars, such as long arms.

Traffic car

A traffic car, also known as a highway patrol car, traffic enforcement unit, speed enforcement unit, or road policing unit, is a police car tasked with enforcing traffic laws and conducting traffic stops, typically on major roadways such as highways. They are often relatively high-performance vehicles compared to patrol cars, as they must be capable of catching up to fast-moving vehicles. They may have specific markings or special emergency lights to either improve or hinder visibility. Alternatively, some traffic cars may use the same models as patrol cars, and may barely differ from them aside from markings, radar speed guns, and traffic-oriented equipment.

Unmarked car

An unmarked car is a police car that lacks markings and often easily-visible or roof-mounted emergency lights. They are generally used for varying purposes, ranging from standard patrol and traffic enforcement to sting operations and detective work. They have the advantage of not being immediately recognizable, and are considered a valuable tool in catching criminals while the crime is still taking place. The resemblance an unmarked police car has to a civilian vehicle varies based on their application: they may use the same models as marked patrol cars, and may be virtually identical to them aside from the lack of roof-mounted emergency lights, with pushbars and spotlights clearly visible; alternatively, they may use common civilian vehicle models that blend in with traffic, with emergency lights embedded in the grille or capable of being hidden and revealed, such as Japanese unmarked cars having retractable beacons built into the car's roof.

Unmarked cars typically use regular civilian license plates, occasionally even in jurisdictions where emergency vehicles and government vehicles use unique license plates, though some agencies or jurisdictions may be able to use the unique plates anyway; for example, American federal law enforcement agencies may use either government plates or regular license plates.

The term "undercover car" is often used to describe unmarked cars. However, this usage is erroneous; unmarked cars are police cars that lack markings but have police equipment, emergency lights, and sirens, while undercover cars lack these entirely and are essentially civilian vehicles used by law enforcement in undercover operations to avoid detection.

The close resemblance of unmarked cars to civilian cars has created concerns of police impersonation. Some police officers advise motorists that they do not have to pull over in a secluded location and instead can wait until they reach somewhere safer. In the UK, officers must be wearing uniforms in order to make traffic stops. Motorists can also ask for the officer's badge and identification or call an emergency number or a police non-emergency number to confirm if the police unit is genuine.

Ghost car 

A ghost car, also known as a stealth car or semi-marked car, is a police car that combines elements of both an unmarked car and a marked patrol car, featuring markings that are either similar colors to the vehicle's body paint, or are reflective graphics that are difficult to see unless illuminated by lights or viewed at certain angles. Ghost cars are often used for traffic enforcement, though they may also be used in lieu of unmarked cars in jurisdictions where they are prohibited or have their enforcement capabilities limited, such as being unable to conduct traffic stops. In these instances, the markings on ghost cars may be sufficient to legally count as marked police cars, despite the markings being difficult to see.

Utility vehicle

A utility vehicle is a police car used for utility or support purposes as opposed to regular police duties. Utility vehicles are usually all-wheel drive vehicles with cargo space such as SUVs, pickup trucks, vans, utes, or off-road vehicles. They are often used to transport or tow assets such as trailers, equipment, or other vehicles such as police boats; they are alternatively used for or are capable of off-roading, especially in fleets where most other vehicles cannot do so. They can also be used for animal control, if that is the responsibility of police within that jurisdiction. Some utility vehicles can be used for transporting teams of officers and occasionally have facilities to securely detain and transport a small number of suspects, provided there is enough seating space.

Police dog vehicle

A police dog vehicle, also known as a K-9 vehicle or a police dog unit, is a police car modified to transport police dogs. The models used for these vehicles range from the same as patrol cars to dedicated SUVs, pickup trucks, or vans. To provide sufficient space for the police dog, there is usually a cage in the trunk or rear seats with enough space for the dog, though some agencies may put the cage in the front passenger seat, or may lack a cage entirely and simply have the dog in the rear compartment. There may or may not be space to transport detainees or additional officers. Police dog vehicles almost always have markings noting they have a police dog on board, typically just the agency's standard markings with the added notice.

Decoy car
A decoy car is a police car used to establish a police presence, typically to deter traffic violations or speeding, without a police officer actually being present. They may be older models retired from use, civilian cars modified to resemble police cars, or demonstration vehicles. In some instances, a "decoy car" may not be a vehicle at all, but rather a life-sized cutout or sign depicting a police car. Use of decoy cars is intended to ensure crime deterrence without having to commit manpower, allowing the officer that would otherwise be there to be freed up for other assignments. A drawback of decoy cars is that they cannot actually enforce laws, and motorists that notice that the police car is a decoy can freely ignore it. To circumvent this, decoy cars may be moved to other locations, used alongside traffic enforcement cameras to directly enforce laws, or used in conjunction with hidden police units further down the road to catch motorists that believe they are safe to continue speeding or are flagged for further crimes such as arrest warrants.

The use of decoy cars is entirely up to the agency, though in 2005, the Virginia General Assembly considered a bill that would make decoy cars a legal requirement for police. The bill stated in part: "Whenever any law-enforcement vehicle is permanently taken out of service... such vehicle shall be placed at a conspicuous location within a highway median in order to deter violations of motor vehicle laws at that location. Such vehicles shall... be rotated from one location to another as needed to maintain their deterrent effect."

Surveillance car
A surveillance car is a police car used for surveillance purposes. Usually SUVs, vans, or trucks, surveillance cars can be marked, unmarked, undercover, or disguised, and may be crewed or remotely monitored. They are used to gather evidence of criminal offenses or provide better vantage points at events or high-traffic areas. The surveillance method used varies, and may include CCTV, hidden cameras, wiretapping devices, or even aerial platforms. Some surveillance cars may also be used as bait cars, deployed to catch car thieves.

Armored vehicle

A police armored vehicle, also known as a SWAT vehicle, tactical vehicle, or rescue vehicle, is an armored vehicle used in a police capacity. They are typically four-wheeled armored vehicles with similar configurations to military light utility vehicles, infantry mobility vehicles, MRAPs, or armoured personnel carriers, albeit lacking mounted weaponry. As their name implies, they are typically used to transport police tactical units such as SWAT teams, though they may also be used in riot control or to establish police presence at events.

Mobile command center 

A mobile command center, also known as an emergency operations center, mobile command post, or mobile police station, is a truck used to provide a central command center at the scene of an incident, or to establish a visible police presence or temporary police station at an event.

Bomb disposal vehicle

A bomb disposal vehicle is a vehicle used by bomb disposal squads to transport equipment and bomb disposal robots, or to store bombs for later disposal. They are often vans or trucks, typically with at least one bomb containment chamber installed in the rear of the vehicle, and ramps to allow bomb disposal robots to access the vehicle. Bomb disposal vehicles are generally not explosive-resistant and are only used for transporting explosives for disposal, not actively disposing of them.

Armed vehicle 
An armed police vehicle is a police vehicle that has lethal weaponry installed on it. These are often technicals or light utility vehicles with machine gun turrets, and may or may not lack emergency lights and sirens. Armed police vehicles are very rare and are usually only used in wartime, in regions with very high violent crime rates, or where combat with organized crime or insurgencies is common to the point that armed police vehicles are necessary; for example, the Iraqi Police received technicals during the Iraq War, and the National Police of Ukraine used armed vehicles during the 2022 Russian invasion of Ukraine, including the STREIT Group Spartan and a modified BMW 6 Series with a mounted machine gun.

These should not be confused with police vehicles that have turrets but do not have guns, which are often just police armored vehicles or, if less-lethal munitions are used, riot control vehicles.

Riot control vehicle

A riot control vehicle, also known as a riot suppression vehicle or simply a riot vehicle, is an armored or reinforced police vehicle used for riot control. A wide array of vehicles, from armored SUVs and vans to dedicated trucks and armored personnel carriers, are used by law enforcement to suppress or intimidate riots, protests, and public order crimes; hold and reinforce a police barricade to keep the scene contained; or simply transport officers and equipment at the scene in a manner safer than what could be achieved with a standard police car.

Common modifications include tear gas launchers, shields, and caged windows. Some riot control vehicles also include less-lethal weaponry and devices, such as water cannons and long-range acoustic devices.

Community engagement, liaison, and demonstration vehicles
A community engagement vehicle, also known as a liaison vehicle, demonstration vehicle, or parade car, is a police car used for display and community policing purposes, but not for patrol duties. These are often high-performance, modified cars, classic police cars, or vehicles seized from convicted criminals and converted to police cars, used to represent the agency in parades, promote a specific program (such as the D.A.R.E. program), or help build connections between law enforcement and certain groups that the vehicle appeals to.

Some cars can be visibly marked but not fitted with audio or visual warning devices. These are used by community liaison officers for transport to engagements and making appearances at community events.

Some vehicles are produced by automotive manufacturers with police markings to showcase them to police departments; these are usually concepts, prototypes, or reveals of their police fleet offerings. Emergency light and siren manufacturers such as Federal Signal, Whelen, and Code 3 also use unofficial police cars to demonstrate their emergency vehicle equipment.

Equipment

Police cars are usually passenger car models which are upgraded to the specifications required by the purchasing police service. Several vehicle manufacturers provide a "police package" option, which is built to police specifications from the factory. Agencies may add to these modifications by adding their own equipment and making their own modifications after purchasing a vehicle.

Mechanical modifications
Modifications a police car might undergo include adjustments for higher durability, speed, high-mileage driving, and long periods of idling at a higher temperature. This is usually accomplished through installing heavy duty suspension, brakes, calibrated speedometer, tires, alternator, transmission, and cooling systems. The car's stock engine may be modified or replaced by a more powerful engine from another vehicle from the manufacturer. The car's electrical system may also be upgraded to accommodate for the additional electronic police equipment.

Warning systems

Police vehicles are often fitted with audible and visual warning systems to alert other motorists of their approach or position on the road. In many countries, use of the audible and visual warnings affords the officer a degree of exemption from road traffic laws (such as the right to exceed speed limits, or to treat red stop lights as a yield sign) and may also suggest a duty on other motorists to yield for the police car and allow it to pass.

Warning systems on a police vehicle can be of two types: passive or active.

Passive visual warnings

Passive visual warnings are the livery markings on the vehicle. Police vehicle markings usually make use of bright colors or strong contrast with the base color of the vehicle. Some police cars have retroreflective markings that reflect light for better visibility at night, though others may only have painted on or non-reflective markings. Examples of markings and designs used in police liveries include black and white, Battenburg markings, Sillitoe tartan, and "jam sandwich" markings.

Police vehicle markings include, at the very least, the word "police" (or a similar applicable phrase if the agency does not use that term, such as "sheriff", "gendarmerie", "state trooper", "public safety" etc.) and the agency's name or jurisdiction (such as "national police" or "Chicago Police"). Also common are the agency's seal, the jurisdiction's seal, and a unit number. Text is usually in the national language or local language, though other languages may be used where appropriate, such as in ethnic enclaves or areas with large numbers of tourists.

Unmarked vehicles generally lack passive visual warnings, while ghost cars have markings that are visible only at certain angles, such as from the rear or sides, making them appear unmarked when viewed from the front.

Another unofficial passive visual warning of police vehicles can simply be the vehicle's silhouette if its use as a police car is common, such as that of the Ford Crown Victoria in North America, or the presence of emergency vehicle equipment on the vehicle, such as a pushbar or a roof-mounted lightbar.

Active visual warnings

Active visual warnings are the emergency lights on the vehicle. These lights are used while responding to attract the attention of other road users and coerce them into yielding for the police car to pass. The colors used by police car lights depend on the jurisdiction, though they are commonly blue and red. Several types of flashing lights are used, such as rotating beacons, halogen lamps, or LED strobes. Some agencies use arrow sticks to direct traffic, or message display boards to provide short messages or instructions to motorists. The headlights and tail lights of some vehicles can be made to flash, or small strobe lights can be fitted in the vehicle lights.

Audible warnings

Audible warnings are the sirens on the vehicle. These sirens alert road users to the presence of an emergency vehicle before they can be seen, to warn of their approach. The first audible warnings were mechanical bells, mounted to either the front or roof of the car. A later development was the rotating air siren, which makes noise when air moves past it. Most modern police vehicles use electronic sirens, which can produce a range of different noises. Different models and manufacturers have distinct siren noises; one siren model, the Rumbler, emits a low frequency sound that can be felt through vibrations, allowing those who would not otherwise hear the siren or see the emergency vehicle to still know it is approaching.

Different siren noises may be used depending on traffic conditions and the context. For example, on a clear road, "wail" (a long up-and-down unbroken tone) is often used, whereas in heavy slow traffic or at intersections, "yelp" (essentially a sped-up wail) may be preferred. Other noises are used in certain countries and jurisdictions, such as "phaser" (a series of brief sped-up beeps) and "hi-lo" (a two-tone up-down sound). Some vehicles may also be fitted with electronic airhorns.

Police-specific equipment
A wide range of equipment is carried in police cars, used to make police work easier or safer. The installation of this equipment in a police car partially transforms it into a desk. Police officers use their car to fill out different forms, print documents, type on a computer or a console, and examine different screens, all while driving. Ergonomics in layout and installation of these items in the police car plays an important role in the comfort and safety of the police officers at work and preventing injuries such as back pain and musculoskeletal disorders.

Communication devices 
Police radio systems are generally standard equipment in police cars, used to communicate between the officers assigned to the car and the dispatcher. Mobile data terminals are also common as alternative ways to communicate with the dispatcher or receive important information, and are typically a tablet or a dashboard-mounted laptop installed in the car.

Suspect transport enclosure 

Suspect transport enclosures are typically located at the rear of the vehicle, taking up the rear seats or rear compartment. The seats are sometimes modified to be a hard metal or plastic bench. Separating the transport enclosure is often a partition, a barrier between the front and rear compartments typically made of metal with a window made of reinforced glass, clear plastic, or metal mesh or bars. Some police cars do not have partitions; in these instances, another officer may have to sit in the rear to secure the detainee, or a dedicated transport vehicle may be called.

Weapon storage 
Weapons may be stored in the trunk or front compartment of the vehicle. In countries where police officers are already armed with handguns, long guns such as rifles or shotguns may be kept on a gun rack in the front or in the trunk, alongside ammunition. In countries where police are not armed or do not keep their guns on them, handguns may be kept in the car instead; for example, Norwegian Police Service officers are issued handguns, but they keep them in a locked compartment in their car that requires high-ranking authorization to access. Less-lethal weaponry and riot gear may also be stored in the trunk.

Rescue equipment 
Rescue equipment such as first aid kits, dressing, fire extinguishers, defibrillators, and naloxone kits are often kept in police cars to provide first aid and rescue when necessary.

Scene equipment 
Tools such as barricade tape, traffic cones, traffic barricades, and road flares are often kept in police cars to secure scenes for further investigation.

Recording equipment 
Recording equipment such as dashcams and interior cameras are installed in some police cars to make audio and video recordings of incidents, police interactions, and evidence.

Detectors 
Detector devices such as radar speed guns, automatic number-plate recognition, and LoJack are used in some police cars, typically in traffic enforcement, to detect speeding violations, read multiple plates for flags (such as warrants or lack of insurance) without having to manually check, and track stolen cars, respectively.

Pushbar 
Pushbars, also known as bullbars, rambars, or nudge bars, are fitted to the chassis of a police car to augment the front bumper. They allow the car to push disabled vehicles out of a roadway, breach small and light objects, and conduct PIT maneuvers with less damage to the front of the vehicle. Pushbar designs vary; some are small and only protect the grille, while others have extensions that shield as far as the headlights. Some pushbars also have emergency lights installed on them, providing additional visual warnings.

Spotlights 
Spotlights are small searchlights typically installed on the A-pillar of a police car. They are used to provide light in darkened areas or where necessary, such as down alleyways or into a suspect's car during a nighttime traffic stop. These spotlights can be aimed and activated by the officers inside the vehicle. Usually, one or two are installed on the car, though more may occasionally be installed on the roof, grille, bumper, or pushbar.

Run lock 
Run locks allow the vehicle's engine to be left running without the keys being in the ignition. This allows adequate power to be supplied to the vehicle's equipment at the scene of an incident without battery drain. The vehicle can only be driven after inserting the keys; if the keys are not inserted, the engine will switch off if the handbrake is disengaged or the footbrake is activated.

Ballistic protection
Some police cars can be optionally upgraded with bullet-resistant armor in the car doors. The armor is typically made from ceramic ballistic plates and aramid baffles. A 2016 news report said that Ford sells 5 to 10 percent of their American police vehicles with ballistic protection in the doors. In 2017, New York City Mayor Bill de Blasio announced that all NYPD patrol cars would have bullet-resistant door panels and bullet-resistant window inserts installed.

Use by country

 Police vehicles in Armenia
 Police vehicles in Australia
 Police vehicles in Austria
 Police vehicles in Belgium
 Police vehicles in China
 Police vehicles in the Czech Republic
 Police vehicles in Denmark
 Police vehicles in France
 Police vehicles in Germany
 Police vehicles in Greece
 Police vehicles in Hong Kong
 Police vehicles in Hungary
 Police vehicles in Iceland
 Police vehicles in India
 Police vehicles in Indonesia
 Police vehicles in Italy
 Police vehicles in Japan
 Police vehicles in Malaysia
 Police vehicles in the Netherlands
 Police vehicles in New Zealand
 Police vehicles in The Philippines
 Police vehicles in Poland
 Police vehicles in Russia
 Police vehicles in South Africa
 Police vehicles in Sweden
 Police vehicles in Taiwan
 Police vehicles in Turkey
 Police vehicles in Ukraine
 Police vehicles in the United Kingdom
 Police vehicles in the United States and Canada
 Police vehicles in Vietnam
 Police vehicles in South Korea

See also

General

Battenburg markings
Emergency vehicle
Police transportation
Mounted police
Use of UAVs in law enforcement

Other types of emergency vehicles

Ambulance
D.A.R.E. car
Fire chief's vehicle
Fire motorcycle
Fire truck
Jam sandwich (police car)
Military police vehicle
Panda car (British police forces)
Police aircraft
Police bicycle
Police bus
Police motorcycle
Police van
Police watercraft
SWAT vehicle

References

External links

Car